Jundiaí is a municipality in the state of São Paulo, in the Southeast Region of Brazil, located  north of São Paulo. The population of the city is 423,006 (2020 est.), with an area of 431.21 km². The elevation is 761 m.
The GDP of the city is U$16.6 billion (R$36.6 billion). The budget for 2013 is U$787 million (R$1.63 billion), according to the official data of the City Hall.

History and Geography 
The locally most-accepted history of the first non-native American colonizers of the locale were Rafael de Oliveira and Petronilha Rodrigues Antunes who fled São Paulo for political reasons and who in 1615 then founded what became known as the Freguesia de Nossa Senhora do Desterro ("The Parish of Our Lady of the Landless").

The municipality was officially founded on December 14, 1655, when it was elevated to the category of village. Its first urbanization was carried out in 1657. Jundiaí has borders with Várzea Paulista, Campo Limpo Paulista, Franco da Rocha, Cajamar, Pirapora do Bom Jesus, Cabreúva, Itupeva, Louveira, Vinhedo, Itatiba and Jarinu.

Formerly spelled Jundiahy, the name of the town comes from the Tupi language, jundiá means "fish with barbs" (the Rhamdia quelen species) and í means river.  Loosely translated, it means "Catfish River."

The city received massive numbers of Italian immigrants in the late 19th century and early 20th century, making most of the city's inhabitants of Italian descent, which constitutes about 75% of the city's population.  Amongst other immigrant groups, there are: Portuguese, Spanish, German and small amounts of Hungarian and Slavic peoples.

Recently, Jundiaí has enjoyed a steep population growth, in large part fueled by a shift of residents from the megalopolis of São Paulo, seeking better living conditions.

Agriculture 
The region burst onto the national stage with the production of grapes, especially with the "pink" variety of the Niagara grape.  To stimulate the production of grapes, with the support of the Associação Agrícola de Jundiaí e Prefeitura (Agriculture Association of Jundiaí and Town Hall), in 1934 Antenor Soares Gandra created the Festa da Uva (Grape Festival), not to be confused with a festival of the same name in Caxias do Sul, Rio Grande do Sul.  Since 1964 the Festa da Uva is celebrated every even-numbered year, alternating with the Festa do Morango (Strawberry Festival) in the park Parque Comendador Antonio Carbonari but most known as the Parque da Uva (Grape Park).

The first Festa do Morango was in 1965 in the Poste neighborhood of the city.  Later, because of the increase in agriculture participants and of the public interest, the event was transferred to the Parque Comendador Antonio Carbonari.

Tourism 
The Serra do Japi (Japi mountain range), situated southeast of the city, is a state park that has a natural reserve with one of the largest forested areas in the state of São Paulo, with beautiful landscapes and many opportunities for ecotourism, large hotel-farms and extreme sports.

The Jundiahy section is a historical area amongst the rivers Jundiai, Guapeva and Mato. It is an affluent neighborhood with fancy houses, gardens and a traditional small community business.

Sports 

Paulista is the city's football (soccer) club. The team, which plays at Jayme Cintra Stadium, was the champion of Copa do Brasil 2005 (Cup of Brazil).

Transportation 

The Jundiaí Airport serves the city and region for small airplanes.
Jundiaí has a connection in the Jundiaí station with Companhia Paulista de Trens Metropolitanos (CPTM).
It has a system of public transportation that costs R$5,00 (USD 0,97) for a one way ticket, as of 2023.  Most of the buses have wheelchair lifts and a few have monitors that broadcast videos about the city and education. The lines are all connected by terminais (terminals), what makes the users' transportation faster and cheaper since there is free circulation in the terminals to the linhas alimentadoras (feeding lines), which carry the passengers from the terminals to their respective destinations . Regular users can register and use a yellow, reloadable electronic card. Students can register for a blue card that charges only half price for each ticket. The elderly or disabled can register for a grey or green card which allows free admittance.

Twin towns and sister cities

 Iwakuni, Japan
 Padova, Italy
 Trenton, USA

Notable people

 Adriano Basso (1975), footballer.
 Ana Carolina Reston Macan (1985–2006), -model.
 Antônio de Queirós Teles, barão de Jundiaí (1789–1870), politician.
 Antônio de Queirós Teles, conde do Parnaíba (1831–1888), politician, and president of São Paulo Province (1886–1887).
 Bianca Bin, actress.
 Dalmo Gaspar
 Décio Pignatari (1927-2012), writer and poet.
 Doni (1979), footballer.
 Duília de Mello (1963), astronomer.
 Eloísa Mafalda (1924), actress.
 Fabio Zanon (1966), musician.
José do Patrocínio Oliveira (Zé Carioca), (1904-1987), musician and voice actor.
 Nenê (1981), footballer.
 Reginaldo (1983-), footballer.

See also 
 Santos-Jundiaí Railroad
 Line 9 (CPTM)
 Line 10 (CPTM)

References

External links

  Official web page of City Hall
  Official web page of Town Hall

 
Populated places established in 1655
1655 establishments in the Portuguese Empire